Ilana Casoy (born February 16, 1960) is a Brazilian writer.
 
She graduated from Fundação Getúlio Vargas and has dedicated herself to the study of criminal psychology, especially related to serial killers.
Ilana Casoy has published several books, some of which are based on famous criminal cases in Brazil, such as “A Prova é a Testemunha” about Isabella Nardoni’s case. She also wrote “O Quinto Mandamento – Caso de Polícia”, a book related to the 2002 murder of the Richthofen couple. From 2012 to 2013, she collaborated with the Discovery Channel.
 
Casoy has also written works of fiction. She was invited by the channel Fox Brasil to create a psychological profile of Dexter Morgan, the anti-hero and protagonist of Dexter, a popular American TV show. Casoy also collaborated on Dupla Identidade, a series written by Gloria Perez and directed by Mauro Mendonça Filho. In this series, Bruno Gagliasso plays a serial killer inspired by Ted Bundy, subject of the book Serial Killers: Crazy or Cruel? The series also features Luana Piovani as a forensic psychologist police officer specialized in hunting serial killers.

Bibliography

References

External links
Ilana Casoy|Investigação Discovery

Living people
1960 births
21st-century Brazilian novelists